The National Development Council (Polish: Narodowa Rada Rozwoju), or NRR, is the principal forum used by some Presidents of Poland for considering policy matters. It was established by Lech Kaczyński in 2009 and, following a hiatus, was reestablished by Andrzej Duda in 2015.

References

External links
 Official website

Government agencies established in 2009
Government agencies of Poland